Patriarch is a high-ranking bishop in certain Orthodox and Catholic churches.

Patriarch may also refer to:
 Patriarch (Buddhism), a historic teacher who transferred the teachings
 Patriarch (Latter Day Saints), the Melchizedek Priesthood office in the Church of Jesus Christ of Latter-Day Saints
 Patriarch (magazine), a defunct American magazine that espoused Biblical patriarchy
 Patriarchs (Bible), prominent figures in the Hebrew scriptures, especially Abraham, Isaac and Jacob
 A male ruler (of a tribe, family, etc.) in a traditional patriarchy
 Patriarch, the sailing ship used to transport the Whitbread Engine
 A character in the video game Killing Floor
"The Patriarchs" (poem) , poem by Simon Armitage on the death of Prince Philip, Duke of Edinburgh

See also 
 Matriarch (disambiguation)
 Patriarchate, the see and jurisdiction of an ecclesiastical Patriarch
 Patriarchalism, a seventeenth-century political theory of absolute monarchy in England
 Nasi or Patriarch of the Jews, the head of the Sanhedrin of Israel from 191 BCE to 425 CE
 Pater familias, the head of a Roman family.
 Supreme Patriarch or Sangharaja, a title given to senior Theravada Buddhist monks